A Lover's Return is a 1946 French drama film directed by Christian-Jaque and starring  Louis Jouvet, Gaby Morlay and François Périer. It was shot at the Cité Elgé in Paris and on location in Lyon. The film's sets were designed by the art director Pierre Marquet. It was entered into the 1946 Cannes Film Festival.

Plot
Jean-Jacques Sauvage, a theatre director believed dead by everyone, is back in Lyon.

Cast
 Louis Jouvet as Jean-Jacques Sauvage
 Gaby Morlay as Geneviève Gonin
 François Périer as François Nisard
 Jean Brochard as Jérôme Nisard
 Ludmilla Tchérina as Karina
 Hélène Ronsard as La jeune femme
 Arthur Honegger as himself / En personne
 Léo Lapara as Marchal
 Armand Lurville as Le commissaire (as Lurville)
 Maurice Nasil as Le cousin
 Max Bozzoni as Serge
 Arthur Hoérée
 Louis Seigner as Edmond Gonin
 Marguerite Moreno as Tante Jeanne

References

External links

1946 films
1940s French-language films
1946 drama films
French black-and-white films
Films directed by Christian-Jaque
Films scored by Arthur Honegger
1940s French films
Films shot in Lyon
Films set in Lyon